Simone Barbier (19 January 1903 – 23 September 1992) was a French tennis player. 

She reached the doubles final at the 1930 French Championships with compatriot Simonne Mathieu in which they lost in straight sets to Elizabeth Ryan and Helen Wills Moody. In 1929 and 1930 she competed in the Wimbledon Championships, reaching the second round in singles, the quarterfinal in doubles with Mathieu and the second round in mixed doubles partnering Jacques Grandguillot. 

Barbier won the doubles title at the covered courts championships of Belgium and France.

She said her favorite stroke was the smash but her most successful stroke was the forehand drive to the opponent's backhand corner.

Grand Slam finals

Doubles: (1 runner-up)

References

1903 births
1992 deaths
French female tennis players
Sportspeople from Nancy, France